Jeļena Ostapenko and Eva Paalma were the defending champions, but neither player chose to participate this year.

Emma Laine and Eugeniya Pashkova won the title, defeating Mia Nicole Eklund and Olivia Pimiä in the final, 6–4, 6–0.

Seeds 
  Emma Laine /  Eugeniya Pashkova (champions)
  Anastasia Bukhanko /  Vanda Lukács (first round/quarterfinals)

Draw

References 
 Draw

Orto-Laakarit Open - Doubles
2014 WD